Bezu is a genus of stilt bugs in the family Berytidae. There are at least two described species in Bezu.

Species
These two species belong to the genus Bezu:
 Bezu maiponga (Gross, G.F., 1950) c g
 Bezu wakefieldi (White, F.B., 1878) c g
Data sources: i = ITIS, c = Catalogue of Life, g = GBIF, b = Bugguide.net

References

Further reading

 
 
 
 

Hemiptera